David Alpay (born 6 October 1980) is a Canadian actor, musician and producer, known for playing Mark Smeaton in the Showtime series The Tudors and Jade in the Epix series From.

Early life
Alpay was born in Toronto, Ontario, and prior to his first film role, he was studying at the University of Toronto.

Career
Alpay played the character "Danny" in the political comedy Man of the Year, starring Robin Williams.

Filmography

Film

Television

External links

1980 births
21st-century Canadian male actors
Canadian male television actors
Canadian male film actors
Living people
Male actors from Toronto
University of Toronto alumni